The Battle of Czarny Ostrów took place on July 20, 1657, during the period in Polish history known as the Deluge. The Polish Crown army commanded by Hetmans Stefan Czarniecki, Jerzy Lubomirski and Stanisław Potocki, supported by Crimean Tatars, defeated a Transylvanian-Cossack-Moldavian-Wallachian army under George II Rakoczi.

In early 1657, following the Treaty of Radnot, southern Poland was invaded by Transylvanian army of George II Rakoczi. Since the main Polish forces of the Polish–Lithuanian Commonwealth were engaged in fighting the Swedish Empire, only a division of Stanisław Potocki was sent southwards. Meanwhile, Rakoczi's army headed towards Kraków, and its march was marked by widespread looting and destruction.

In May 1657, during a meeting in Sokal, Polish leaders decided to carry out a revenge attack on the Principality of Transylvania. In June of the same year, Swedish forces abandoned Rakoczi, and headed to Denmark, due to the outbreak of the Dano-Swedish War.

Meanwhile, Hetman Lubomirski with 4,000 soldiers concentrated his forces in Sambor, and, together with thousands of peasants, invaded Transylvania. Lubomirski stayed in Transylvania until July, when he returned, and joined forces with the division under Potocki. This took place near Stryj.

On July 11, Stefan Czarniecki defeated the Transylvanian-Cossack-Moldavian-Wallachian army of Rakoczi in the Battle of Magierów. On July 16, Czarniecki's division joined the forces of Lubomirski and Potocki, and the hetmans decided to destroy Rakoczi. Meanwhile, the Cossacks of Anton Zdanowicz abandoned the Transylvanians, and their situation became desperate. Under these circumstances, Rakoczi sent envoys to the Poles, asking for a peace treaty. Lubomirski and Potocki were willing to sign a treaty, while Czarniecki and his soldiers wanted to fight, hoping for rich booty.

On July 20, near the village of Czarny Ostrów in Podolia, Polish forces attacked the Transylvanian camp. Rakoczi then decided to abandon all wagons with booty, and retreated towards Miedzybóż, where negotiations began. Czarniecki tried to prevent this, but was overruled by other leaders, and on July 23, a treaty was signed by both sides. Rakoczi was obliged to break the alliance with the Swedish Empire, pull his garrisons out of the occupied cities of Kraków and Brest, and pay 1.2 million Polish złotys to the Polish-Lithuanian Treasury. Furthermore, he was obliged to pay 1 million złotys to the Polish hetmans, and 2 million to the Polish soldiers.

The treaty did not prevent Rakoczi's army from total annihilation. Three days later the Transylvanians were attacked by Crimean Tatars, who at that time were allied with Poland. The Tatars disregarded the treaty, and on July 31, they entered Rakoczi's camp, located in Trembowla. Some 11,000 soldiers were captured, including high-ranking officers, such as Janos Kemeny. Rakoczi himself managed to escape the trap, and returned to Transylvania with a handful of men.

Sources 
	Miroslaw Nagielski, Warszawa 1656, Wydawnictwo Bellona, Warszawa 1990, 
	Leszek Podhorodecki, Rapier i koncerz, Warszawa 1985, 

Second Northern War
1657 in the Polish–Lithuanian Commonwealth